Stuart Wenn is an Australian rules football field umpire in the Australian Football League. He made his AFL umpiring debut in 1995, and as of the end of 2013 has umpired in 332 senior matches.

Wenn's father, Rex, was a leading Victorian Football Association umpire during the 1970s, who umpired in Grand Finals in that competition.

References

Living people
Year of birth missing (living people)
Australian Football League umpires